Reich is a German noun meaning "realm" or "empire"; reich is a German adjective meaning "rich". It may also refer to:

Places
 Reich, Germany, a town in Rhineland-Palatinate
 the Holy Roman Empire of the German Nation (911–1806), "Heiliges Römisches Reich Deutscher Nation", also called "Old Empire" ("Altes Reich") and sometimes the "First Reich";
 the German Reich, "Deutsches Reich", Germany's official name from 1871 to 1945:
 the German Empire (1871–1918), "Deutsches Kaiserreich", also called the "Second Reich";
 the German colonial empire, the colonies of the German Empire;
 the Weimar Republic (1919-1933), which continued to use Deutsches Reich as its official name;
 the Third Reich (1933–1945), "Drittes Reich", term for Nazi Germany and a one possible reference to that period in English.

Other uses
 Reich (video game), a cancelled first-person shooter developed by UTV True Games
Reich (surname)
 Das Reich (newspaper), a National Socialist newspaper
 the "Fourth Reich", a neo-nazi term for a resurrection of the Third Reich
  Many additional German words start with Reich. See:
 Reich, the general article
 Glossary of Nazi Germany

See also 

 Deutsch (disambiguation)
 Raich (disambiguation)
 

German-language surnames
Jewish surnames